St. Gorazd Peak is the rocky, partly ice-free peak rising to 892 m in southeastern Poibrene Heights on Blagoevgrad Peninsula, Oscar II Coast in Graham Land, Antarctica.  It is overlooking Vaughan Inlet to the northeast.

The feature is named after the Great Moravian scholar St. Gorazd (9-10th century AD), a disciple of St. Cyril and St. Methodius.

Location

Maps
 Antarctic Digital Database (ADD). Scale 1:250000 topographic map of Antarctica. Scientific Committee on Antarctic Research (SCAR). Since 1993, regularly upgraded and updated.

Notes

References
 St. Gorazd Peak. SCAR Composite Antarctic Gazetteer.
 Bulgarian Antarctic Gazetteer. Antarctic Place-names Commission. (details in Bulgarian, basic data in English)

External links
 St. Gorazd Peak. Copernix satellite image

Mountains of Graham Land
Oscar II Coast
Bulgaria and the Antarctic